Benedito Lacerda Ribeiro, known as Bené (born 16 February 1941) is a former Brazilian football player.

He played 13 seasons and 278 games in the Primeira Liga for Leixões, Porto and Sporting Espinho.

Club career
He made his Primeira Liga debut for Leixões on 27 October 1963 in a game against Porto.

References

1941 births
Living people
Brazilian footballers
Leixões S.C. players
Brazilian expatriate footballers
Expatriate footballers in Portugal
Primeira Liga players
FC Porto players
S.C. Espinho players
S.C. Lamego players
Liga Portugal 2 players
Association football forwards